Elizabeth Noemí Arcia Obando (born 31 March 1997) is a Nicaraguan footballer who plays as a defender for the Nicaragua women's national team.

Early life
Arcia was born in Managua.

International career
Arcia capped for Nicaragua at senior level during the 2018 Central American and Caribbean Games, the 2018 CONCACAF Women's Championship qualification and the 2020 CONCACAF Women's Olympic Qualifying Championship qualification.

References 

1997 births
Living people
Sportspeople from Managua
Nicaraguan women's footballers
Women's association football defenders
Nicaragua women's international footballers